Anachis vermiculucostata is a species of sea snail in the family Columbellidae, the dove snails.

References

 Monsecour, K. & Monsecour, D., 2009. - A new species of Anachis (Gastropoda: Neogastropoda: Columbellidae) from the Philippines. Gloria Maris 48(4-5): 109-112

vermiculucostata
Gastropods described in 2009